Leslie Pressnell (11 November 1922 – 6 September 2011) was a British monetary historian. He taught at the University of Exeter, University College London, his alma mater the London School of Economics, City, University of London, and finally the University of Kent, where he was Professor of Economic and Social History. He authored several books.

Selected works

Further reading

References

1922 births
2011 deaths
Alumni of the London School of Economics
Academics of the University of Exeter
Academics of the London School of Economics
Academics of City, University of London
Academics of the University of Kent
British historians